Floyd Creek is a stream in Adair County in the U.S. state of Missouri.

Floyd Creek has the name of Jonathan Floyd, a pioneer settler.

See also
List of rivers of Missouri

References

Rivers of Adair County, Missouri
Rivers of Missouri